Harton  is a village and civil parish in the Ryedale district of the county of North Yorkshire, England. The population of the civil parish was less than 100 at the 2011 Census, so the details are included in the civil parish of Barton-le-Willows. However, in 2015, North Yorkshire County Council estimated the population to be 80.

References 

Villages in North Yorkshire
Civil parishes in North Yorkshire